Fernando Falchetto (born 20 August 1971) is an Argentine former field hockey player who competed in the 1992 Summer Olympics.

References

External links
 

1971 births
Living people
Argentine male field hockey players
Olympic field hockey players of Argentina
Field hockey players at the 1992 Summer Olympics
Pan American Games medalists in field hockey
Pan American Games gold medalists for Argentina
Field hockey players at the 1995 Pan American Games
Medalists at the 1995 Pan American Games
20th-century Argentine people
21st-century Argentine people